Portea silveirae is a plant species in the genus Portea.

The bromeliad is endemic to the Atlantic Forest biome (Mata Atlantica Brasileira), located in southeastern Brazil.  It is found within Bahia, Espírito Santo,
and Minas Gerais states.

References

silveirae
Endemic flora of Brazil
Flora of Bahia
Flora of Espírito Santo
Flora of Minas Gerais
Flora of the Atlantic Forest